Robert Bainbridge may refer to:
 Bob Bainbridge (fl. 1920s), English footballer for Lincoln City
 Robert Bainbridge (footballer) (1931–2021), English footballer for York City
 Robert S. Bainbridge (1913–1959), American politician from New York